George Telesmar Oubre Sr. (February 22, 1918 – May 28, 1998) was an American politician. He served as a Democratic member of the Louisiana State Senate.

References 

1918 births
1998 deaths
People from Vacherie, Louisiana
People from Norco, Louisiana
Democratic Party Louisiana state senators
20th-century American politicians
Tulane University Law School alumni